The San Francisco Open was a golf tournament played in the San Francisco area. It was played at a number of different courses in the December to February period. From 1930 to 1941 it was a match-play event before becoming a 72-hole stroke play event from 1942 to 1946.

A non-PGA Tour event was played in May 1954 at Lake Merced Golf Club and was won by Shelley Mayfield. It was played over 54 holes and had prize money of $10,000.

Winners

References

Former PGA Tour events
Golf in California